The Atlantic seaboard watershed is a watershed of the Atlantic Ocean in eastern North America along the Atlantic Canada (Maritimes) coast south of the Gulf of Saint Lawrence Watershed, and the East Coast of the United States north of the Kissimmee River watershed of Lake Okeechobee basin in the central Florida Peninsula.

The continental area east of the Appalachian Mountains and highlands to the north and south is demarcated on the south by drainage to the Lake Okeechobee basin (which drains both westward to the Gulf and eastward to ocean), the Eastern Continental Divide (ECD) to the west, and the Saint Lawrence divide to the north.  US physiographic regions of this watershed are the Atlantic Plain and the Appalachian Mountains & Highlands.

Sub-watersheds adjacent to the Saint Lawrence divide
Chedabucto Bay: 
Gulf of Maine: 
Long Island Sound: 
Lower New York Bay: >

Other notable sub-watersheds
Delaware Bay:  — larger than several, but not adjacent to either divide
Rehoboth Bay
Indian River Bay
Assawoman Bay 
Isle of Wight Bay 
Sinepuxent Bay 
Chincoteague Bay 
Chesapeake Bay:  — adjacent to both divides (at the Triple Divide point)

Sub-watersheds adjacent to the Eastern Continental Divide
Albemarle Sound: >
Winyah Bay: >
Santee River: >
Savannah River: 
St. Johns River: 
Biscayne Bay: >
Kissimmee River:

References

North American watersheds of the Atlantic Ocean